Moammereh (also Romanized as Mo‘ammereh; also known as Mo‘ammarā Sangūr, Mo‘ammarā Sangūr, Moammare, Mo‘ammareh Şangūr, Mo‘ammareh Şongūr, Mo‘ammareh-ye Şangūr, and Nowābād) is a village in Jazireh-ye Minu Rural District, Minu District, Khorramshahr County, Khuzestan Province, Iran. At the 2006 census, its population was 808, in 164 families.

References 

Populated places in Khorramshahr County